Buffalo Partial Reserve is a protected area in Angola. It lies on the western slope of the Angolan highlands in Benguela Province, east of the city of Benguela.

The partial reserve covers an area of 400 km2. It protects portions of the Angolan Miombo woodlands and Angolan scarp savanna and woodlands ecoregions.

References

Protected areas of Angola
Angolan miombo woodlands
Benguela Province